Si Todos Fuesen Iguales a Ti (English: If Everyone were like you; Portuguese: Se Todos Fossem Igual a Você) is a song written by Vinicius de Moraes, Antonio Carlos Jobim and adapted by David Trueba. This version is performed by Rosa León and Miguel Bosé and was first included on León's album Ay Amor! in 1992. Miguel Bosé later included this track on the special edition of his album Papito.

References

1992 songs
Male–female vocal duets
Songs with lyrics by Vinicius de Moraes
Songs with music by Antônio Carlos Jobim